The 2007 Presidents Cup was held in 2007 between September 27 and 30. It was played at the Royal Montreal Golf Club in Île Bizard, Quebec, Canada. The United States team won the competition by a margin of 19–14.

Format
On the first day six matches of foursomes were played. On the second day six matches of four-ball were played. On the third day five matches of foursomes were played in the morning and five matches of four-ball were played in the afternoon. On the fourth and final day, twelve singles matches were played. 34 matches were played in all.

Teams
Both teams have 12 players plus a non-playing captain. Members of the U.S. Team were selected based on earnings from the 2005 World Golf Championships - NEC Invitational through the 2007 PGA Championship. International Team players were chosen on the basis of the Official World Golf Ranking through the 2007 PGA Championship. The International Team does not include players eligible for the European Ryder Cup Team.

OWGR as of September 23, 2007, the last ranking before the Cup

Thursday's matches
All matches were foursomes.

Friday's matches
All matches were in four-ball format.

Saturday's matches

Morning foursomes

Afternoon four-ball

Sunday's matches
All matches featured are in singles competition.

Individual player records
Each entry refers to the win–loss–half record of the player.

International

United States

External links
Official scores
Presidents Cup 2007 

Presidents Cup
Presidents Cup
Sports competitions in Montreal
Presidents Cup
Presidents Cup
Presidents Cup
2000s in Montreal
2007 in Quebec